The golliwog, also spelled golliwogg or shortened to golly, is a doll-like character, created by cartoonist and author Florence Kate Upton, which appeared in children's books in the late 19th century, usually depicted as a type of rag doll. It was reproduced, both by commercial and hobby toy-makers, as a children's toy called the "golliwog", a portmanteau of golly and polliwog, and had great popularity in the Southern United States, the UK and Australia into the 1970s. The doll is characterised by jet black skin, eyes rimmed in white, exaggerated red lips and frizzy hair, a blackface minstrel tradition. Today, the word is regarded as a racial slur towards black people.

Though home-made golliwogs were sometimes female, the golliwog was generally male. For this reason, in the period following World War II, the golliwog was seen as a suitable soft toy for a young boy, akin to a teddy bear or a sock monkey. Golliwogs were collected throughout the Caribbean Islands.

While some people see the doll as an innocuous toy associated with childhood, it is considered by most to be a racist caricature of black Africans, alongside pickaninnies, minstrels, and mammy figures. The Jim Crow Museum of Racist Memorabilia described the golliwog as "the least known of the major anti-black caricatures in the United States". Changing political attitudes with regard to race have reduced the popularity and sales of golliwogs as toys. Manufacturers who have used golliwogs as a motif (e.g. Robertson's marmalade in the UK) have either withdrawn them as an icon or changed the name. In particular, the use of alternative names such as "golly" and "golly doll" has risen due to association with the pejorative term "wog", which many dictionaries say may be derived from "golliwog" rather than being an acronym for "western oriental gentleman".

In fiction 

Florence Kate Upton was born in 1873 in Flushing, New York, United States, the daughter of English parents who had emigrated to the United States three years previously. Following the death of her father, she moved back to England with her mother and sisters when she was fourteen. There she spent several years drawing and developing her artistic skills. To afford tuition to art school, she illustrated a children's book entitled The Adventures of Two Dutch Dolls and a Golliwogg. The 1895 book included a character named the Golliwogg, who was first described as "a horrid sight, the blackest gnome", but who quickly turned out to be a friendly character, and is later attributed with a "kind face." A product of the blackface minstrel tradition, the Golliwogg had jet black skin; bright red lips; and wild woolly hair. He wore red trousers, a shirt with a stiff collar, red bow-tie, and a blue jacket with tails – all traditional minstrel attire.

Upton's book and its many sequels were extremely successful in England, largely because of the popularity of the Golliwogg. Upton did not trademark her character, and its name, spelt "golliwog", became the generic name for dolls and images of a similar type. Upton's Golliwogg was jovial, friendly and gallant, but some later golliwogs were sinister or menacing characters. For instance, a number of Enid Blyton's Noddy and Big Ears books feature Golliwog, sometimes as heroes but often as a villain or as naughty individuals. Other authors took a similar tack. The name "golliwog" came to be used as a degrading term for anyone who was not white-skinned, and new origins were suggested for the word. Upton despaired: "I am frightened when I read the fearsome etymology some deep, dark minds can see in his name."

The golliwog doll became a popular children's toy throughout most of the 20th century, and was incorporated into many aspects of British commerce and culture.

In culture

In the USA, it became popular in the form of children's literature, dolls, children's china and other toys, ladies' perfume, and jewellery.

Golliwogg's Cakewalk is the sixth and final piece in the Children's Corner, a suite for piano published by French composer Claude Debussy in 1908.

British jam manufacturer James Robertson & Sons used a golliwog called Golly as its mascot from 1910, after John Robertson apparently saw children playing with golliwog dolls in the United States. Robertson's started producing promotional Golly badges in the 1920s, which could be obtained in exchange for tokens gained from their products. By the 1950s, the firm had incorporated the figure into the advertising campaign for its jams with the slogan "Golly! They're Good."

In 1983, Robertson's products were boycotted by Ken Livingstone's Greater London Council as offensive, and in 1988 the character ceased to be used in television advertising. The company used to give away golliwog badges and small plaster figures playing musical instruments (jazz musicians) or sports and other such themes. The Gollywog badge collection scheme was withdrawn in 2001.

Virginia (Ginny) C. Knox, previously brand director for Robertson's and later Chief Operating Officer of the Culinary Brands Division of RHM, told The Herald newspaper in Scotland in 2001 that the decision to remove the Golly symbol from Robertson's jam and marmalade jars was taken after research found that children were not familiar with the character, although it still appealed to the older generations. "We sell 45 million jars of jam and marmalade each year and they have pretty much all got Golly on them," said Knox. "We also sell 250,000 Golly badges to collectors and only get 10 letters a year from people who don't like the Golliwog image." Today, Robertson's Golly badges remain highly collectible, with the very rarest sometimes selling for more than £1,000.

According to an editorial in The Times newspaper, golliwogs were banned by the Nazis in 1934 on the grounds they were inappropriate toys for young German children, "for of all non-Aryans none is more completely non-Aryan than he [Golliwog]... Some say he is so attractive an advertisement for a black face that his presence makes it harder to teach the young to wash."

An aniseed-flavoured chewy confection called a Blackjack was marketed in the United Kingdom from the 1920s with a golliwog's face on the wrapper. In the late 1980s, Trebor, the manufacturer, replaced the image with the face of a black-bearded pirate.

A classic contortionist act is the rag doll act: often performed in a golliwog costume, it is therefore also called the golliwogg act.

In The League of Extraordinary Gentlemen: Black Dossier and Volume III: Century, Alan Moore and Kevin O'Neill included Upton's original Golliwog with a slightly reimagined, alien past. When this was attacked as a racist character, Moore responded that the Upton's original Golliwog "was a dignified and respectable figure. His courage and strength of character were ably demonstrated in his picaresque adventures, as was his intellectual acumen."

Association with racism

United Kingdom 
In March 2007, Greater Manchester Police seized two golliwogs from a shop after a complaint that the dolls were offensive. In September 2008, a woman from Stockport claimed she was arrested for keeping a "golly doll" in her window. Greater Manchester Police denied this, and said she was arrested after a series of complaints of alleged racially aggravated behaviour were made against her.

In February 2009, in an off-air conversation at the BBC, Carol Thatcher, the daughter of former British Prime Minister Margaret Thatcher, referred to the black French tennis player Jo-Wilfried Tsonga, who was competing in the Australian Open, as looking like a golliwog. The comment was considered by the BBC as "wholly unacceptable" and Thatcher was informed that unless she apologised she would no longer be a reporter on BBC's The One Show. Thatcher stated that it was a silly joke and declined to make an "unconditional apology". Thatcher said that her comment was a reference to the golliwog motifs that she saw in her childhood on jars of jam (made by Robertson's). In April that year, she was interviewed on The Andrew Marr Show, a BBC television programme, defending her use of the word. The French publication Sportsweek claimed that Thatcher, in talking about a previous competition, referred to another player as "the one who was defeated by the golliwog in the previous tour." The French publication, which showed a picture of Tsonga above a picture of a toy golliwog, claimed that Thatcher was "mortified" and that her comment was about the similarity of Tsonga's appearance to the doll that she had as a child.

In March 2011, Conservative English politician Bill Etheridge and his wife, Star, resigned from the Conservatives after their membership was suspended following complaints from party members that they were photographed posing with knitted golliwogs on their Facebook profile pages as part of a protest against political correctness.

In December 2013, a councillor in Brighton was forced to apologise for stating to a newspaper reporter that golliwogs were not racist. Councillor Dawn Barnett was defending a local shop which was selling golliwog drinks mats. She stated, "I said I can see no harm in them. They are nostalgic, I'm 72 years old. My generation grew up with them." Bert Williams, speaking on behalf of Brighton and Hove Black History Group, said the word "golliwog" was historically used to tease black people, of which he had personal experience.

In April 2018, a man in Prestatyn was fined £250 plus £85 costs for displaying a golliwog in a window opposite two Indian restaurants. He pleaded guilty to a racially aggravated public order offence."

In July 2018, a YouGov poll asked 1,660 Britons whether it was "racist to sell or display a golliwog doll", to which a 63% responded "No", 20% "Yes", and 17% "I'm Not Sure".

Australia 
On 1 December 2016, Australian Aboriginal activist, author and filmmaker Stephen Hagan caused a national controversy when he labelled Toowoomba the "most racist city in Australia" after a display of nine golliwog dolls were placed by Terry White Chemists underneath a sign inviting shoppers to "Experience a White Christmas". The controversy began when Toowoomba man George Helon spotted the dolls placed beneath the sign, and circulated a picture of it on Facebook and Twitter. The display was only in one store, as a franchisee can "stock and sell products at their discretion"; however, Terry White Chemists banned the sale of the doll in any franchise afterwards.

New Zealand 
On 22 March 2021, the Gollyville quilt of a Whakatane artist, Barbara Key, was removed from the Art House's Carving Symposium and Art Exhibition, due to a visitor finding the quilt to be offensive.

See also 

 The Black and White Minstrel Show
 Black dolls
 Darlie
 Hajji Firuz
 Golliwogg's Cakewalk
 The Golliwogs, an American rock band that later became Creedence Clearwater Revival
 Golly Bar
 Inki
 Little Black Sambo
 Papa Lazarou
 Pickaninny
 Raggedy Ann
 Sambo's Restaurant Chain
 Zwarte Piet

References

External links 

 "The Adventures of Two Dutch Dolls and a Golliwogg" by Bertha Upton 1895 at Project Gutenberg
 "Golliwogg.co.uk" An independent guide to golliwogs
 "The Golliwog Caricature," Jim Crow Museum of Racist Memorabilia Article by David Pilgrim, Ferris State University, Michigan
 "Gollydownunder.com" A brief history of golliwogs
 Clean plates GOLIWOG license plate
 BBC News – Row erupts over golly exhibition 13 January 2007
 
  The Daily Mirror – Carol Thatcher's (Golliwog) slurs on (tennis player) Jo-Wilfried Tsonga 2009-07-02
 Contortionists performing Golliwogg acts: L.I.M.E Trio, 1937, The Florida Trio, 1950, The Morlidor Trio, 1966

Stuffed toys
Traditional dolls
Anti-African and anti-black slurs
Characters in children's literature
Male characters in literature
Black people in European folklore
Black people in literature
Stereotypes of African Americans
Toy controversies
Rag dolls